(Who seeks the splendour, who desires the radiance), BWV 221, is a cantata by an unknown composer, formerly attributed to Johann Sebastian Bach. The event for which it was written is also unknown.

Scoring and structure 
The cantata is scored for tenor and bass soloists, bassoon, three violins, viola, cello and organ.

It has nine movements:
Sinfonia
Recitative (tenor): 
Duet aria (tenor and bass): 
Recitative (bass): 
Aria (tenor): 
Recitative (bass): 
Aria (bass): 
Recitative (tenor): 
Duet aria (tenor and bass):

Recording 
Alsfelder Vokalensemble / Steintor Barock Bremen, Wolfgang Helbich. The Apocryphal Bach Cantatas. CPO, 1991.

Notes

References 

Cantatas
Bach: spurious and doubtful works